HTTP Client Hints (or simply Client Hints) are a set of HTTP Header Fields for proactive content negotiation in the Hypertext Transfer Protocol (HTTP). The client can advertise information about itself through these fields so the server can determine which resources should be included in its response.

As an abstract example, the server might indicate in an Accept-CH response header of an initial request that it can accept device pixel ratio information from the client. The client will then make future requests using a header field containing these details, and the server will respond with images appropriate for that device pixel ratio.

References

External links 

 
 User-Agent Client Hints – Draft Community Group Report, 9 February 2021
 Client Hints – MDN Web Docs Glossary

Hypertext Transfer Protocol headers